Fernando Rodríguez (born 25 February 1931) is an Argentine former bobsledder. He competed in the two-man and the four-man events at the 1964 Winter Olympics.

His uncle is Arturo Rodríguez.

References

External links
 

1931 births
Possibly living people
Argentine male bobsledders
Olympic bobsledders of Argentina
Bobsledders at the 1964 Winter Olympics
Place of birth missing (living people)